Pterocarpus officinalis, the dragonsblood tree, is a species of flowering plant in the family Fabaceae, native to southern Mexico, Central America, the Caribbean, and northern South America. It is typically found in coastal freshwater or slightly brackish habitats, in association with mangroves that occupy the more saline areas. Its timber is commercially traded.

References

officinalis
Flora of Southwestern Mexico
Flora of Veracruz
Flora of Southeastern Mexico
Flora of Central America
Flora of the Caribbean
Flora of northern South America
Flora of Ecuador
Flora of Colombia
Flora of North Brazil
Flora of Northeast Brazil
Plants described in 1763
Flora without expected TNC conservation status